Markevičius is the masculine form of a Lithuanian family name. Its feminine forms  are: Markevičienė (married woman or widow) and Markevičiūtė (unmarried woman). It is a Lithuanized form of the East Slavic surname Markevich literally meaning "son of Mark". The Polish-language versions are Markiewicz/Markiewicz. 

The surname may refer to:

Kazys Markevičius (1905-1980), Lithuanian boxer
Vytautas Markevičius, Lithuanian politician
Gvidonas Markevičius (born 1969), Lithuanian basketball player
Tadas Markevičius, Lithuanian football (soccer) player
Marius A. Markevicius, American producer, director and writer

See also
Margevičius, a similar surname

Lithuanian-language surnames